The 1994 New York Jets season was the 35th season for the team and the 25th in the National Football League. It began with the team trying to improve upon its 8–8 record from 1993 under new head coach Pete Carroll. The franchise’s largest home crowd at that time, 75,606, watched the Jets battle Miami for a share of first place in the AFC East. The Jets led, 24–6, in the third quarter before Dan Marino led a furious comeback, capped by the “fake spike” touchdown pass to Mark Ingram, for the Dolphins’ 28–24 win. The Jets finished the season with a record of 6–10, losing six of their last seven games to end the season, and Carroll was fired.  Following a Week 12 win at Minnesota, the Jets would lose 33 of the next 37 games.

Offseason 
After the 1993 season, the Jets fired head coach Bruce Coslet, who had coached the team for four years, and promoted defensive coordinator Pete Carroll to Jets head coach.

NFL Draft

Personnel

Staff

Roster

Regular season

Schedule

Game summaries

Week 1

Week 7

Week 13 vs Dolphins

Standings

Turning point 
In Week 13, the Jets were 6–5 and were still in the hunt for a playoff berth (a win would have created a first-place tie in the AFC East) as they faced the Dolphins. With the Jets leading 24–21 late in the game, Dolphin quarterback Dan Marino was ready to spike the ball to stop the clock, but instead he tricked the Jets defense by tossing for a game-winning touchdown and a Dolphin win. The Jets never recovered as they lost the remaining four games of the season and Pete Carroll, who called the loss "a staggering defeat", subsequently lost his job as Jets head coach. This game began a nosedive for the team that spanned the remaining two seasons, as between the end of the 1994 season and the close of the 1996 NFL season; the Jets won only 4 of their next 36 games following the "fake spike".

References

External links 
 1994 statistics

New York Jets seasons
New York Jets
New York Jets season
20th century in East Rutherford, New Jersey
Meadowlands Sports Complex